Sebayeng, also known as Solomondale, is a township in the Polokwane Local Municipality of the Capricorn District Municipality of the Limpopo province of South Africa. It is located about 37 km east of the city of Polokwane on the R81 road.

Education 
Sebayeng Primary School.
Mafolofolo High School.

References 

Populated places in the Polokwane Local Municipality